Motke Chabad (Mordechai Chabad) (c.1820-c.1880) was a Jewish Lithuanian (litvak) jester (badchen) from Vilnius known from many Jewish jokes.

Mordechai complained: "Had God willed it, I could have made a hundred golden rubles yesterday". People asked: "How could that be?" He replied: "A rich matron said she would give me one hundred golden rubles to look upon me." They told him: "Mordechai, you fool, why did you refuse?" He answered: "I did not refuse. It was just that she was blind in both eyes".

In many jokes he is an archetypal schlemiel, misfortunate in his endeavors:
Motke decided to become a teamster, but soon he noticed that his horses eat lots of oats and decided to train them out of this bad habit depriving him of all profits. So he started giving them less and less oats and soon they ate almost none of it. The horses didn't complain, but suddenly they died all. "What a pity!" - grieved he. - "Would they endure one more week and they wouldn't need oats at all!".

Some jokes of Motke Chabad are ascribed to Hershele Ostropoler and vice versa.

References

Further reading
Der Velt Barimter Komiker Motke Habad
 M. Shtern Motke Chabad. Zayne aneḳdoten, ṿitsen, stsenes un shṭuḳes (free read and download, in Yiddish; reprinted by the National Yiddish Book Center)

19th-century Lithuanian Jews
Jewish humorists
Jewish comedy and humor